Plaza de Toros de Merced is a bullring in Huelva, Spain. It is currently used for bull fighting. The stadium holds 15,000 spectators. It was opened in 1902.

References

Merced
Sports venues in Andalusia